Kuhsor (formerly Dzhingilik) is a village in Sughd Region, northern Tajikistan. It is part of the jamoat Chashmasor in Ghafurov District.

References

Populated places in Sughd Region